The top tier of football in South Africa was renamed the Premier Soccer League, for the start of the 1996-97 season. The following page details the football records and statistics of the Premier Division since that date.

Titles

Most titles: 12 
Mamelodi Sundowns
Most consecutive title wins: 5 
Mamelodi Sundowns: (2017-18, 2018-19, 2019-20, 2020-21, 2021-22)
Biggest title winning margin (34 games): 8 points
Manning Rangers: (1996-97)Biggest title winning margin (30 games): 16 points
Mamelodi Sundowns: (2021-2022)Smallest title winning margin: 0 points and +5 goal difference — (1998-99)
Mamelodi Sundowns (+44) over Kaizer Chiefs (+39)

WinsMost wins in a season (34 games): 23 
Manning Rangers (1996-97)
Mamelodi Sundowns (1998-99), (1999-2000)
Kaizer Chiefs (1998-99)Most wins in a season (30 games): 22 
Mamelodi Sundowns (2015-16)Most wins in total: 384
Mamelodi Sundowns

DrawsMost draws in a season (34 games): 16 draws
Supersport United (1996-97)
Jomo Cosmos (1996-97)Most draws in a season (30 games): 20 draws
Moroka Swallows (2020-2021)Most draws in total: 239
Kaizer ChiefsMost home draws in a season (34 games):Most home draws in a season (30 games):Most away draws in a season (34 games):Most away draws in a season (30 games):Fewest draws in a season: 3 draws
Santos (1997-98)Fewest home draws in a season:Fewest away draws in a season:Most consecutive draws in a season:LossesMost losses in a season (34 games): 28
Mother City (1999–2000)Fewest losses in a season (30 games): 1
 Mamelodi Sundowns (2020–2021)Most losses in total: 184
Amazulu

AttendanceHighest attendance: 92,515 
Kaizer Chiefs v. Orlando Pirates (2010-2011)

GoalsMost goals in a season: 73
Kaizer Chiefs (1998–1999)Fewest goals in a season: 22
Mother City (1999–2000)Most goals conceded in a season: 85
Mother City (1999–2000)Fewest goals conceded in a season: 11
Kaizer Chiefs (2003–2004)Best goal difference in a season: +44
Mamelodi Sundowns (1998–1999)Worst goal difference in a season: -63
Mother City (1999–2000)Most goals by relegated team: Most goals in total: 753
Kaizer ChiefsMost goals conceded: 771
Moroka SwallowsLargest goal deficit overcome to win: Largest goal deficit overcome to draw:PointsMost points in a season: 71
Mamelodi Sundowns (2015-2016) Fewest points in a season: 10
Mother City (1999–2000)Fewest away points in a season: 0
Mother City (1999–2000)Fewest points surviving relegation:Promotion and change in positionSurviving promoted clubs: Relegated promoted clubs: Promoted but never relegated:Biggest rise in position:Biggest fall in position:Lowest finish by defending champions:MiscellaneousMost Premier Soccer League Medals: 9
Denis Onyango

Appearances and goalsMost Premier Soccer League appearances: 316
Edries Burton (1996/1997–2006/2007)Most Premier Soccer League appearances for one club: 316
Edries Burton (Engen Santos)Oldest player: 46 years
Andre Arendse for Bidvest Wits v. Pretoria University, 1 May 2013Youngest player: 15 years, 174 days
Mkhanyiseli Siwahla for Ajax Cape Town v. Dynamos, 23 February 2004Most Premier Soccer League goals: 111
Siyabonga Nomvethe; 111, Daniel MudauMost Premier Soccer League goals for one club: 106
Wilfred Mugeyi (Umtata Bush Bucks); 93, Daniel Mudau (Mamelodi Sundowns)Oldest Premier Soccer League goalscorer: 39 years 10 months and 17 days
Siyabonga Nomvethe (Amazulu)Youngest goalscorer: 15 years, 174 days
Mkhanyiseli Siwahla for Ajax Cape Town v. Dynamos, 23 February 2004Most consecutive Premier Soccer League matches scored in: 7
Lehlohonolo Majoro for Kaizer Chiefs 2012–13Most consecutive Premier Soccer League seasons scored in: 9
Katlego Mashego (2004–present)Most goals in a season: 25
Collins Mbesuma for Kaizer Chiefs (2004–2005)Most goals in a calendar year: 35
Collins Mbesuma for Kaizer Chiefs 2005Most hat tricks in Premier Soccer League: 6
Pollen Ndlanya for AmaZulu and Orlando Pirates (1999–2002)Most hat tricks in a season: 3
Richard Henyekane for Golden Arrows (2008–2009)Most consecutive hat tricks in a season: 2
Peter Shalulile for Mamelodi Sundowns (2021–22).Most goals in a match: 5
James Chamanga, Moroka Swallows 6-2 Platinum Stars, 9 Dec 2007Fastest hat trick: A space of 4 minutes (between '20 and '24)
James Chamanga, Moroka Swallows 6-2 Platinum Stars, 9 Dec 2007Most goals in a debut season: 22
Wilfred Mugeyi for Bush Bucks (1996–1997)Fastest goal: 9 seconds
Aleni Lebyane for Free State StarsMost consecutive seasons to score at least 15 goals: 4
Daniel Mudau for Mamelodi Sundowns (1996–2000)Most consecutive seasons to score at least 10 goals: 3
Lehlohonolo Majoro (2010–present)Most clubs to score for: 7
Mabhuti Khenyeza

Long range goalsLongest range goal:''' 80 metres
Mor Diouf for Supersport United v. Mamelodi Sundowns (2012-2013)

References

Soccer in South Africa